Torben G. Andersen is a Danish economist, currently the Nathan S. and Nancy S. Sharp Professor of Finance at Kellogg School of Management, Northwestern University. He also teaches finance at the EDHEC Business School (Ecole des Hautes Etudes Commerciales du Nord) in Lille. He is a fellow of the European Economic Association.

References

External links

Year of birth missing (living people)
Living people
Northwestern University faculty
American economists
Fellows of the Econometric Society
Fellows of the European Economic Association